Sphincterochila baetica is a species of air-breathing land snail, a terrestrial pulmonate gastropod mollusk in the family Sphincterochilidae.

Distribution 
This species occurs in Spain, Morocco, and Algeria.

Shell description 
The shell is globose, solid, whitish ash-color. The shell has 5 whorls which are very slowly increasing, the upper ones carious-rugulose, the penultimate about as broad as the last. The last whorl is more or less angulated on the periphery, and rounded in front.

The aperture is widely lunate, angulated exteriorly. The peristome is internally sublabiate.

The width of the shell is 25 mm.

References
This article incorporates public domain text from reference.

External links 
 http://www.animalbase.uni-goettingen.de/zooweb/servlet/AnimalBase/home/species?id=2672
 George Washington Tryon, Jr. 1887. Manual of Conchology. Second series: Pulmonata. Volume 3. Helicidae - Volume I. Plate 2, figure 36–37..

Sphincterochilidae
Gastropods described in 1854